Pulaski is a city in Davis County, Iowa, United States. The population was 264 at the time of the 2020 census.

History 
Pulaski was founded in 1856. It is named for Casimir Pulaski.

Corn show 
The Pulaski Corn Show, held annually on a September weekend, is a citywide celebration with a parade.

Geography
Pulaski is located on Iowa Highway 2 southeast of the county seat of Bloomfield and west of Milton.

Transportation
Iowa Highway 2 passes through Pulaski.

Demographics

2010 census
As of the census of 2010, there were 260 people, 104 households, and 80 families residing in the city. The racial makeup of the city was 100.0% White. Hispanic or Latino of any race were 0.8% of the population.

There were 104 households, of which 38.5% had children under the age of 18 living with them, 57.7% were married couples living together, 10.6% had a female householder with no husband present, 8.7% had a male householder with no wife present, and 23.1% were non-families. 20.2% of all households were made up of individuals, and 5.8% had someone living alone who was 65 years of age or older. The average household size was 2.50 and the average family size was 2.83.

The median age in the city was 39.7 years. 26.5% of residents were under the age of 18; 8.1% were between the ages of 18 and 24; 21.6% were from 25 to 44; 30% were from 45 to 64; and 13.8% were 65 years of age or older. The gender makeup of the city was 52.7% male and 47.3% female.

2000 census
As of the census of 2000, there were 249 people, 103 households, and 70 families residing in the city. The racial makeup of the city was 97.19% White, 0.40% Native American, and 2.41% from two or more races.

There were 103 households, out of which 31.1% had children under the age of 18 living with them, 59.2% were married couples living together, 3.9% had a female householder with no husband present, and 32.0% were non-families. 30.1% of all households were made up of individuals, and 24.3% had someone living alone who was 65 years of age or older. The average household size was 2.42 and the average family size was 2.99.

In the city, the population was spread out, with 27.7% under the age of 18, 4.0% from 18 to 24, 24.5% from 25 to 44, 25.3% from 45 to 64, and 18.5% who were 65 years of age or older. The median age was 40 years. For every 100 females, there were 84.4 males. For every 100 females age 18 and over, there were 80.0 males.

The median income for a household in the city was $30,694, and the median income for a family was $38,750. Males had a median income of $24,318 versus $23,750 for females. The per capita income for the city was $14,334. About 6.6% of families and 10.8% of the population were below the poverty line, including 19.7% of those under the age of eighteen and 14.0% of those 65 or over.

See also

 List of cities in Iowa

References

External links

Cities in Iowa
Cities in Davis County, Iowa